Claremont is a city in Catawba County, North Carolina, United States. The population was 1,352 at the 2010 census. It is part of the Hickory–Lenoir–Morganton Metropolitan Statistical Area.

History
Originally known as Charlotte Crossing, and later as Setzer Depot, Claremont began using its current name in 1892.  The name is from Clare Sigmon, the daughter of an early settler.  The city incorporated in 1893.

The Bunker Hill Covered Bridge and Rock Barn Farm are listed on the National Register of Historic Places.

Geography
Claremont is located east of the center of Catawba County at  (35.713752, -81.150661). U.S. Route 70 passes through the center of town, leading west  to Conover and east  to Catawba. Interstate 40 passes just north of the town, with access from Exit 135. I-40 leads west  to Hickory and east  to Statesville.

Demographics

2020 census

As of the 2020 United States census, there were 1,692 people, 685 households, and 487 families residing in the city.

2010 census
As of the census of 2010, there were 1,355 people, 456 households, and 300 families residing in the city. The population density was 542.0 people per square mile (159.7/km2). There were 492 housing units at an average density of 196.3 per square mile (75.7/km2). The racial makeup of the city was 95.66% White, 2.22% African American, 0.10% Native American, 0.87% Asian, 0.67% from other races, and 0.48% from two or more races. Hispanic or Latino of any race were 2.99% of the population.

There were 456 households, out of which 27.2% had children under the age of 18 living with them, 55.3% were married couples living together, 8.1% had a female householder with no husband present, and 34.0% were non-families. 28.5% of all households were made up of individuals, and 12.9% had someone living alone who was 65 years of age or older. The average household size was 2.28 and the average family size was 2.79.

In the city, the population was spread out, with 20.2% under the age of 18, 8.9% from 18 to 24, 31.6% from 25 to 44, 25.9% from 45 to 64, and 13.4% who were 65 years of age or older. The median age was 38 years. For every 100 females, there were 97.7 males. For every 100 females age 18 and over, there were 92.1 males.

The median income for a household in the city was $40,652, and the median income for a family was $49,886. Males had a median income of $30,543 versus $22,500 for females. The per capita income for the city was $21,097. About 5.3% of families and 7.0% of the population were below the poverty line, including 10.8% of those under age 18 and 15.3% of those age 65 or over.

Notable people
 William Harrison Anderson, missionary for the Seventh-day Adventist Church
 Landon Huffman, competed in NASCAR Camping World Truck Series
 Robert Huffman, former NASCAR driver

Media
 The Claremont Courier, free monthly publication

References

External links

 City website

Cities in Catawba County, North Carolina